The 27th Assembly District of Wisconsin is one of 99 districts in the Wisconsin State Assembly. Located in eastern Wisconsin, the district comprises northeast Sheboygan County and southeast Manitowoc County.  It includes part of northern Sheboygan, as well as the cities of Plymouth and Kiel, and the villages of Cleveland, Elkhart Lake, and Kohler.  It also contains Lakeland University, the Whistling Straits and Blackwolf Run golf courses, the Road America motorsport course, and the Sheboygan County Memorial Airport.  The district is represented by Republican Amy Binsfeld, since January 2023.

The 27th Assembly district is located within Wisconsin's 9th Senate district, along with the 25th and 26th Assembly districts.

History
The district was created in the 1972 redistricting act (1971 Wisc. Act 304) which first established the numbered district system, replacing the previous system which allocated districts to specific counties.  The 27th district 
was drawn somewhat in line with the boundaries of the previous Milwaukee County 12th district (downtown Milwaukee) with the addition of northern parts of what had been the Milwaukee County 17th district (Port of Milwaukee).

Following the 1982 court-ordered redistricting, which scrambled all State Assembly districts, the 1983 redistricting moved the 27th district to Sheboygan County, comprising the rural towns surrounding the more suburban municipalities of Sheboygan, Kohler, and Sheboygan Falls.  The controversial 2011 redistricting plan (2011 Wisc. Act 43) split the city of Sheboygan between the 26th and 27th districts, in order to create two safe Republican districts from what had previously been the competitive 26th and safe Republican 27th.

List of past representatives

References 

Wisconsin State Assembly districts
Sheboygan County, Wisconsin
Manitowoc County, Wisconsin